Fonder is a surname. Notable people with the surname include:

George Fonder (1917–1958), American racecar driver
Mary Jane Fonder (1942–2018), American criminal

See also
Finder (surname)

French-language surnames